Tripwire is a 1989 American film directed by James Lemmo.

It is an action/adventure film about a terrorist and government secret agent personal vendetta that began when a train hijacking goes badly awry and the terrorist's son is accidentally killed. The original music score was composed by Richard Stone. Originally intended for a theatrical release (it did get releases only in Europe between 1989 and 1990), the movie was released directly to video and laserdisc on March 21, 1990 in the U.S. by RCA/Columbia and in Canada on video only by Cineplex Odeon. The movie has not been released on DVD and as of December 26, 2009, Sony has not announced any plans to release the movie on DVD.

Plot
A band of ruthless international terrorists led by Josef Szabo (David Warner) hijack a speeding railroad train loaded with a full arsenal of powerful military weaponry capable of threatening world peace. The only hero who can stop the terrorists' scheme for world domination is Jack DeForest (Terence Knox). During the battle between good and evil the hero DeForest accidentally kills the son of the Szabo. Seeking revenge Szabo locates DeForest’s family, murders his wife and kidnaps their teenage son thereby turning their fight it into a personal vendetta.

So, DeForest must fight not only to save the world, but for his only remaining family.

Cast
 Terence Knox as Jack DeForest
 David Warner as Josef Szabo
 Meg Foster as Julia
 Yaphet Kotto as Lee Pitt
 Isabella Hofmann as Annie
 Charlotte Lewis as Trudy
 Sy Richardson as "Turbo"
 Andras Jones as Rick DeForest
 Marco Rodriguez as "El Tigre"
Viggo Mortensen as Hans
 Tommy Chong as Merle Shine
 Richard Stay as Jeff Szabo
 Lou Bonacki as Reese
 Dean Tokuno as Mizoguchi
 Jon Richard Platten as Major Riley

Production
Parts of the film were shot in Park City, Utah.

References

External links

1980s action drama films
American action drama films
CineTel Films films
Films scored by Richard Stone (composer)
1989 drama films
1989 films
1980s English-language films
Films directed by James Lemmo
1980s American films